Niladri Sarkar or Colonel Niladri Sarkar is a fictional detective character created by Bengali novelist Syed Mustafa Siraj. Some of the Colonel stories written for children were translated into English.

Character 
Niladri Sarkar is a retired Colonel of the Indian Army, jovial and looking like Santa Claus. He introduces himself as a nature specialist, butterfly collector and ornithologist. The Colonel smokes a pipe and is fond of Coffee. Most of the Colonel stories are narrated by Jayanta Chowdhury, a reporter of Dainik Satyasebak Patrika. Jayanta is a lazy journalist who accompanies him on his missions. Sometimes Mr. K. K. Halder, a bit eccentric retired police officer also joins with colonel Sarkar. Colonel likes quoting Bengali proverbs and nursery rhymes. He maintains a good temperament while solving mystery. Colonel solves complex cases in his own ingenious way.

Stories 
The first story of Colonel Niladri Sarkar 'Chaya Pore' was published serially in Amrit Magazine in 1970. Thereafter Siraj wrote hundreds of stories for teen and adults. Some of are:

 Sabuj Sanket
 Kuashay Mrityur Ghran
 Pargacha
 Faand
 Ziro Ziro Ziro
 Sonar Damru
 Khokon Gelo Mach Dhorte
 Janalar Nichey Ekta Lok
 Prem Hatya Ebong Colonel
 Trishule Rokter Daag
 Kalo Pathor
 Dui Nari
 Hangor
 Patal Khondok
 Sundar Bivisika
 Macbeth'er Dainira
 Swarger Bahon
 Bigroho Rahasya
 Daniel Kuthir Hatya Rahasya
 Kakcharitra
 Kokodwiper Bivisika
 Panther Rahasya
 Manushkhekor Faand
 Tibbati Guptabidya
 Arunachaler Yeti
 Chiramburur Guptadhan
 Kalo Bakser Rahasya
 Toradwiper Voyonkor
 Tupir Karchupi
 Turuper Taas
 Alexanderer Bantul
 Bole Gechen Ram Shanna
 Kodondo Paharer Ba Rahasya
 Vimgarher Kalo Daityo
 Padmar Chore Voyonkor
 Vuture Ek Kaktarua
 Pretatma O Valuk Rahasya
 Batrisher Dhandha
 Rajbarir Chitro Rohasya
 Toy Pistol
 Vutrakkhos
 Jekhane Colonel
 Raja Salomoner Angti
 Sandhyanire Andhokar
 Kingbodontir Shankhochur
 Lohagarar Durbasa Muni
 Gurgin Khar Deoal
 Damrudihir Vut
 Kalo Kukur
 Ghatotkocher Jagoron
 Tibbati Guptobidya
 Ozraker Panja

Adaptation
In 2013 a film Colonel was released under the direction of Raja Sen. Chiranjeet played the titular role and Saheb Chatterjee played as Jayanta.

References 

Fictional Bengali people
Fictional amateur detectives
Fictional Indian people